The Broken Melody is a 1916 British silent romance film directed by Cavendish Morton and starring John Martin Harvey, Hilda Moore and Manora Thew. A woman leaves her husband, a Polish violinist, but returns to him after he is wounded fighting a duel.

Cast
 John Martin Harvey - Paul 
 Hilda Moore - Duchess 
 Manora Thew - Mabel 
 Courtice Pounds   
 Barbara Hannay   
 Fred Rains
 Nelson Ramsey   
 Edward Sass

References

External links
 

1916 films
British silent feature films
1910s English-language films
1910s romance films
Ideal Film Company films
British black-and-white films
British romance films
1910s British films